Galenara lixaria is a species of geometrid moth in the family Geometridae. It is found in North America.

The MONA or Hodges number for Galenara lixaria is 6630.

References

Further reading

 

Melanolophiini
Articles created by Qbugbot
Moths described in 1883